Mathiesen is a Danish-Norwegian patronymic surname meaning "son of Mathies" (equivalent of the Biblical Μαθθαιος, cf. English Matthew). Several spelling variants are used, including Matthiesen, Matthiessen, Mathisen, Matthisen. A similar diversity of forms exist for the parallel given name Mathias.
There are several people with the surname Mathiesen:

Árni Mathiesen (born 1958), Icelandic politician
Børge Mathiesen (1918–1962),  Danish football player
Brian Vad Mathiesen, (born 1978), Danish engineer and professor
Charles Mathiesen (1911–1994), Norwegian speed skater
Mathiesen family, a Norwegian business family, including
Christian Pierre Mathiesen (1870–1953), Norwegian politician for the Conservative Party
Haagen Mathiesen (1759–1842),  Norwegian timber merchant, ship-owner and politician.
Haaken C. Mathiesen (1827–1913), Norwegian landowner and businessperson
Haaken L. Mathiesen (1858–1930), Norwegian landowner and businessperson
Jørgen Mathiesen  (1901–1993),  Norwegian landowner and businessperson
Hein-Arne Mathiesen (born 1971), Norwegian ski jumper
Mattis Mathiesen (born 1924),  Norwegian photographer and film director
Mihkel Mathiesen (1918–2003), Estonian politician
Niels Mathiesen (1829–1900),  Norwegian politician and merchant
Pål Mathiesen (born 1977), Norwegian musician
Per Mathiesen (1885–1971),  Norwegian gymnast
Thomas Mathiesen (1933–2021), Norwegian sociologist

Matthiesen may refer to:

 Leroy Matthiesen, Roman Catholic Bishop of Amarillo, Texas
 Mark Matthiesen, American politician from Missouri

See also 
Matthiessen
Mathiasen

Danish-language surnames
Norwegian-language surnames
Patronymic surnames